Chihiro Yamaguchi (born 10 June 1996) is a Japanese professional footballer who plays as a midfielder for WE League club Sanfrecce Hiroshima Regina.

Club career 
Yamaguchi made her WE League debut on 12 September 2021.

References 

Living people
1996 births
Japanese women's footballers
Women's association football midfielders
Sanfrecce Hiroshima Regina players
WE League players
Association football people from Nagasaki Prefecture